Rhodnius prolixus is the principal triatomine vector of the Chagas parasite due to both its sylvatic and domestic populations in northern South America as well as to its exclusively domestic populations in Central America. Sylvatic R. prolixus, as virtually all Rhodnius spp., is primarily associated with palm tree habitats and has a wide range of hosts including birds, rodents, marsupials, sloths, and reptiles.

The insect was used by Sir Vincent Wigglesworth for the detection of insect hormones. It has been implicated in the transmission of transposons between it and some of its vertebrate hosts, squirrel monkeys and opossums.

Rhodnius prolixus is also known as the kissing bug because it tends to feed on the area around victims' mouths.

History
Rhodnius prolixus established itself throughout Central America after specimens that originated in Venezuela accidentally escaped from a San Salvadoran research laboratory in 1915. It colonized houses and invaded neighboring countries, probably through accidental carriage by travelers.

Life cycle
The insect has five larval stages, with a moult between each.  Each larval stage consumes a single large meal of blood, which triggers the moulting process, 12–15 days later.  Wigglesworth demonstrated that the moult is started by prothoracicotropic hormone (PTTH) secreted into the blood in response to hormone release by neurosecretory cells in the brain.  Further it was demonstrated that the corpora allata secrete the juvenile hormone which prevents the premature development into an adult.  The removal of the head during any larval stage causes early development into an adult, whereas the implantation of a juvenile head during the fifth larval stage results in a giant sixth stage larva.

The adult secretes compounds into the wound during feeding, including lipocalins. These lipocalins were demonstrated to serve various functions including sequestering amines – especially serotonin – to prevent vasoconstriction (and possibly coagulation) in the host by Andersen et al 2003.
The male reproductive system of R. prolixus contains four accessory glands, three which are responsible for producing the spermathecae and one which is responsible for the movement of spermatozoa from the spermatophore into the female. Once mating occurs, the sperm move through the reproductive system of the female through peristatic waves. The female then stores the sperm until fertilization.

As disease vector

Chagas disease is caused by the parasitic protozoan Trypanosoma cruzi.
Infection with Chagas disease occurs after Rhodnius releases protozoans in its
feces immediately following a blood meal.  The parasite enters the victim through
the bite wound after the human host scratches the bite.  Infection may also occur via blood
transfusion and ingestion of food contaminated with kissing bug feces.

See also
 Vector epidemiology
 Inherited sterility in insects
 Nitrophorins
 Hematophagy
 Hemozoin
 Proctolin

References

Further reading
 William C Marquardt et al (2004), Chapter 5: Kissing Bugs and Bedbugs the Heteroptera, Biology of Disease Vectors (2nd edition), Academic Press,

External links
 VectorBase's genomic resource for Rhodnius prolixus
 Rhodnius prolixus from Animal Diversity Web

Reduviidae
Fauna of Argentina
Insect vectors of human pathogens
Chagas disease
Insects described in 1859
Insects of South America